The 1968–69 Yorkshire Cup was the sixty-first occasion on which the Yorkshire Cup competition had been held. Leeds won the trophy by beating Castleford by the score of 22-11. The match was played at Belle Vue, in the City of Wakefield, now in West Yorkshire. The attendance was 12,573 and receipts were £3,746.

Background 

This season there were no junior/amateur clubs taking part, no new entrants and no "leavers" and so the total of entries remained the  same at sixteen.

This in turn resulted in no byes in the first round.

Competition and results

Round 1 
Involved  8 matches (with no byes) and 16 clubs

Round 2 - quarterfinals 
Involved 4 matches and 8 clubs

Round 2 - replays  
Involved  1 match and 2 clubs

Round 3 – semifinals  
Involved 2 matches and 4 clubs

Final

Teams and scorers 

Scoring - Try = three (3) points - Goal = two (2) points - Drop goal = two (2) points

The road to success

Notes and comments 

 The score in this match is given as 18-30 by RUGBYLEAGUEproject  but  in "100 Years of Rugby. The History of Wakefield Trinity 1873-1973" the score is given as 18-40 and is further described in the book as "Trinity's heaviest defeat at home in County Cup football and the highest score by any opponent on Trinity's ground for 10 years"
 Belle Vue is the home ground of Wakefield Trinity with a capacity of approximately 12,500. The record attendance was 37,906 on the 21 March 1936 in the Challenge Cup semi-final between Leeds and Huddersfield

General information for those unfamiliar 
The Rugby League Yorkshire Cup competition was a knock-out competition between (mainly professional) rugby league clubs from  the  county of Yorkshire. The actual area was at times increased to encompass other teams from  outside the  county such as Newcastle, Mansfield, Coventry, and even London (in the form of Acton & Willesden.

The Rugby League season always (until the onset of "Summer Rugby" in 1996) ran from around August-time through to around May-time and this competition always took place early in the season, in the Autumn, with the final taking place in (or just before) December (The only exception to this was when disruption of the fixture list was caused during, and immediately after, the two World Wars)

See also 
1968–69 Northern Rugby Football League season
Rugby league county cups

References

External links
Saints Heritage Society
1896–97 Northern Rugby Football Union season at wigan.rlfans.com
Hull&Proud Fixtures & Results 1896/1897
Widnes Vikings - One team, one passion Season In Review - 1896-97
The Northern Union at warringtonwolves.org

1968 in English rugby league
RFL Yorkshire Cup